The United States Merchant Marine Academy's intercollegiate sports teams are called the Mariners and they compete in the Division III of the NCAA, generally as once a charter member of the Landmark Conference. In 2016, they returned to the Skyline Conference in all sports. Men's sports include baseball, football, basketball, cross country, lacrosse, soccer, swimming & diving, tennis, wrestling and track and field. Women's sports include basketball, cross country, lacrosse, swimming and diving, track and field, and volleyball.

In football, the teams were an associate member of the Liberty League until 2017, when they joined the New England Women's and Men's Athletic Conference as an associate member. In collegiate wrestling, they are a member of the Centennial Conference. The USMMA was a member of the Skyline Conference until the 2006–07 season. The football teams also plays for an annual rivalry trophy in football, known as the Secretaries Cup, against the Bears of the United States Coast Guard Academy.

In rugby, the USMMA competes in the MetNy Rugby Football Union where the team was the first division champion from 2005–2006.

The men's swim & dive team has had a long history of success, winning 20 straight conference championships (2000–2020) and are the only team to win the Landmark Conference championship until their departure from the conference in 2016.

The USMMA Varsity Intercollegiate Sailing Team competes at the Middle Atlantic Intercollegiate Sailing Association (MAISA) of the Intercollegiate Sailing Association (ICSA) and has fifteen National Championships to its credit, as well as nearly two dozen district titles. The Mariners won their first ICSA National (now "North American") Championship in 1979. The Mariners have five dinghy championships in 1979, 1983, 1984, 1987 and 1996. Six sailors have received College Sailor of the Year recognition, Jonathan Wright 1971, Alex Smigelski 1979, Morgan Reeser, 1983 and 1984, Jay Renehan 1985, William Hardesty III, 1998. The school has had 32 All American Skippers, 11 Honorable mention skippers, and 10 All American crews.

References

External links